In Greek mythology, Carmanor or Karmanor (Ancient Greek: Καρμάνωρ) may refer to the following personages:

Carmanor, a Cretan priest and who purified Apollo after he killed Python
Carmanor, son of Dionysus and Alexirrhoe.